Lana Jean Gordon is an American singer, best known for her appearances in Broadway and theatre productions.

Early life and education
Gordon was born in New London, Connecticut. In 1989, she studied dance at New York City's Alvin Ailey School on a scholarship. She subsequently took part in a repertory ensemble directed by Sylvia Walters for over 3 years, before joining Donald Bird's ensemble The/Group. In the summer of 1994, she worked for 3 months in Yokkaichi Japan as a soloist at a prestigious restaurant and lounge where she performed popular standards and show tunes to the region's upper-class clientele.  Later in the same year, Gordon played the role of Dionne in the European tour of the musical "Hair".

In 1997, Gordon debuted on Broadway as an ensemble cast member in Lion King, a role she played for 2½ years, one of her roles was a cheetah. Following this, she joined the cast of Broadway musical Jesus Christ Superstar. After Jesus Christ Superstar she was asked to come to The Lion King to play the role of Shenzi. In 2003 she took on the role of Anita in West Side Story, and toured Europe numerous of times over her 5 years in the role. She recently launched a solo singing career in Europe.

Gordon has also worked as a model in America, both in print and TV advertising.

Musicals

Broadway 
 2021: Hadestown (Persephone (at some performances))
 1997–2001: The Lion King (Original Cast & Recording)
 2000: Jesus Christ Superstar
2017-2019, and 2022: Chicago as Velma Kelly

Theatre 
 1993: The Minstrel Show
 1995: Hair (European Tour)
 1995: Tommy
 1996: Beggars Holiday
 1997: Odysseus
 1990: Stepping Out
 2003–2005: West Side Story (European & Asian Tour)
 2005: Chicago
 2007: Carmen Cubana
 2007–2008: West Side Story (European Tour)
 2009: Tarzan
2014: Chicago (Stuttgart Production)
 2019: Chicago

Productions 
 1997: The Lion King Recording (Album)
 2006: Carmen Cubana Recording (Album)
 2006: Garden of Love (Single)
 2007: Hold on – that Piano Track (Single)
 2007: Can We Live – Cover (Single)
 2008: Angels (Single)
 2008: Miracle Within (Single)
 2008: Because Time (Single)
 2008: Missing (Single)
 2009: Yes! (Single, Western Union campaign song)
 2009: Child in Time (Single, Alternative Hair Song)

External links 
 www.lanagordon.net
 www.facebook.com/pages/Lana-Gordon/45051522330

American women singers
Living people
Year of birth missing (living people)
Musicians from New London, Connecticut
Singers from Connecticut
21st-century American women